Niklas Hjalmarsson (born 6 June 1987) is a Swedish professional ice hockey defenceman for HV71 of the Swedish Hockey League (SHL).

He previously played for the Chicago Blackhawks and Arizona Coyotes of the National Hockey League (NHL). Drafted in the fourth round (108th overall) by the Blackhawks in the 2005 NHL Entry Draft, Hjalmarsson won three Stanley Cups (2010, 2013, and 2015) as well as a silver Olympic medal with Sweden at the 2014 Winter Olympics.

Playing career

Chicago Blackhawks
Hjalmarsson was drafted 108th overall in the 2005 NHL Entry Draft by the Chicago Blackhawks. He played professionally for three years in the Elitserien with HV71.

In the 2007–08 season, his first in North America, Hjalmarsson made his NHL debut with the Blackhawks. After spending the majority of the season with the Rockford IceHogs, Chicago's American Hockey League (AHL) affiliate, he procured a regular spot on the roster after defenceman James Wisniewski's trade to the Anaheim Ducks.

Hjalmarsson scored his first career NHL goal against Ty Conklin of the Detroit Red Wings.

Hjalmarsson became a key part of the Blackhawks' lineup late into the 2008–09 season and to begin the 2009–10 season. In 2009–10, he played 77 games in the regular season and all 22 in the Stanley Cup playoffs for the team, averaging over 19 minutes played per game, switching between the second and third defensive pairings. Over that time, he recorded a production value (PROD) of a point roughly every 45 minutes of it, while his season PROD was 89 minutes. During the 2010 Stanley Cup playoffs, a slapshot Hjalmarsson took was redirected by teammate Andrew Ladd to give Chicago a 3–2 lead in Game 6 of the 2010 Stanley Cup Finals; the team won the game in overtime, 4–3, and eventually the Stanley Cup.

On 9 July 2010, shortly after the end of the season, Hjalmarsson signed a four-year, $14 million offer sheet with the San Jose Sharks. Three days later, however, on 12 July, the Blackhawks announced that they would match the offer sheet. Hjalmarsson became the first NHL defenceman in 13 years to receive an offer sheet as a restricted free agent, and, critically, Chicago's matching of the offer meant that they no longer had enough cap space to re-sign goaltender Antti Niemi, who coincidentally ended up joining the Sharks later that off-season.

During 2012–13 NHL lockout, Hjalmarsson played in Italy's Serie A and in the IIHF Continental Cup with HC Bolzano.

During game 7 of the Western Conference's semifinal series against the Detroit Red Wings, with the score tied at 1–1 late in the third period, Hjalmarrson scored what appeared to be a go-ahead goal with 1:47 left in regulation time, but referee Stephen Walkom called offsetting penalties on Detroit's Kyle Quincey and Chicago's Brandon Saad just before the puck went in, so the goal was disallowed. Brent Seabrook went on to score the game-winning goal in overtime, to win the series for the Blackhawks. The Blackhawks won the 2013 Stanley Cup Finals. During the 2013 off-season, Hjalmarsson signed a five-year extension with the Blackhawks, at an annual average salary of $4.1 million.

The Blackhawks won the Stanley Cup again in 2015, making Hjalmarsson one of only seven players to be part of the 2010, 2013, and 2015 Stanley Cup victories.

Arizona Coyotes and initial retirement
After the 2016–17 season, his 10th year with the Blackhawks, Hjalmarsson's tenure with the club came to an end as he was dealt to the Arizona Coyotes in exchange for Connor Murphy and Laurent Dauphin on 23 June 2017. Hjalmarsson was named an alternate captain for the Coyotes to begin the 2017–18 season. On 1 July 2018, Hjalmarsson signed a two-year, $10 million contract extension with the Coyotes.

On 25 July 2021, Hjalmarsson retired from professional ice hockey after 14 seasons in the NHL.

Return to HV71
After one season away from professional play, Hjalmarsson came out of retirement to re-sign with HV71 on 10 November 2022.

Career statistics

Regular season and playoffs

International

See also
 List of NHL players who have signed offer sheets

References

External links

 

1987 births
Living people
Arizona Coyotes players
Bolzano HC players
Chicago Blackhawks draft picks
Chicago Blackhawks players
HV71 players
Ice hockey players at the 2014 Winter Olympics
IK Oskarshamn players
Medalists at the 2014 Winter Olympics
Olympic ice hockey players of Sweden
Olympic medalists in ice hockey
Olympic silver medalists for Sweden
People from Eksjö Municipality
Rockford IceHogs (AHL) players
Stanley Cup champions
Sportspeople from Jönköping County
Swedish expatriate ice hockey people
Swedish ice hockey defencemen